Adnan is, according to tradition, a descendant of Ishmael and an ancestor of the Islamic prophet Muhammad.

Adnan may also refer to:
 Adnan (name), an Arabic name and lists of people with the given name or surname
Adnan (actor), Bangladeshi film actor
 Adnan AIFV, the Malaysian variant of the ACV 300 Armoured Fighting Vehicle
 "Adnan", a track by Orbital from the album In Sides

See also
 adhan, the Islamic call to prayer